The 1987 Stanley Cup playoffs, the playoff tournament of the National Hockey League (NHL) began on April 8, after the conclusion of the 1986–87 NHL season. It concluded on May 31, with the Edmonton Oilers defeating the Philadelphia Flyers to win the Stanley Cup. In an attempt to reduce the number of first round upsets, the NHL expanded the Division Semifinals series from a best-of-five series to a best-of-seven series.

The 1987 playoffs marked the second consecutive year that all four former WHA teams made the playoffs in the same year. It would not happen again until 1999 by which time 3 of those teams had moved, the Quebec Nordiques to Denver, the Winnipeg Jets to Phoenix, and the Hartford Whalers to Raleigh. For the second time ever, the first time being 1978, all of the Original Six teams made the playoffs in the same season.

At the time the Philadelphia Flyers set an NHL playoff record by playing in 26 games during the playoffs. This record was equaled by four other teams (2004 Calgary Flames, 2014 Los Angeles Kings, 2015 Tampa Bay Lightning, and 2019 St. Louis Blues) before the 2020 Dallas Stars broke the record during the expanded 2020 Stanley Cup playoffs.

Playoff seeds

The following teams qualified for the playoffs:

Prince of Wales Conference

Adams Division
 Hartford Whalers, Adams Division champions – 93 points
 Montreal Canadiens – 92 points
 Boston Bruins – 85 points
 Quebec Nordiques – 72 points

Patrick Division
 Philadelphia Flyers, Patrick Division champions, Prince of Wales Conference regular season champions – 100 points
 Washington Capitals – 86 points
 New York Islanders – 82 points
 New York Rangers – 76 points

Clarence Campbell Conference

Norris Division
 St. Louis Blues, Norris Division champions – 79 points
 Detroit Red Wings – 78 points
 Chicago Blackhawks – 72 points
 Toronto Maple Leafs – 70 points

Smythe Division
 Edmonton Oilers, Smythe Division champions, Clarence Campbell Conference regular season champions, Presidents' Trophy winners – 106 points
 Calgary Flames – 95 points
 Winnipeg Jets – 88 points
 Los Angeles Kings – 70 points

Playoff bracket

Division Semifinals

Prince of Wales Conference

(A1) Hartford Whalers vs. (A4) Quebec Nordiques

This was the second playoff series meeting between these two teams. Harford won the only previous meeting in a three-game sweep in the last year's Adams Division Semifinals.

This was the last series that the Nordiques/Avalanche franchise won in Quebec City, the franchise did not win another playoff series until 1996 when they were the Colorado Avalanche.

(A2) Montreal Canadiens vs. (A3) Boston Bruins

This was the 22nd playoff series between these two teams. Montreal lead 19–2 in previous playoff series. This was the fourth straight year meeting in the Division Semifinals. Montreal won last year's Adams Division Semifinals in a three-game sweep.

(P1) Philadelphia Flyers vs. (P4) New York Rangers

This was the eighth playoff series meeting between these two teams. New York won four of the previous seven meetings, including last year's Patrick Division Semifinals in a 3–2 series upset.

(P2) Washington Capitals vs. (P3) New York Islanders

This was the fifth playoff series meeting between these two teams. New York won three of the previous four series all in the past four years. Washington won last year's Patrick Division Semifinals in a three-game sweep.

Game seven of this series went four overtimes, and is known as the Easter Epic.  It was the only one this year to go beyond one OT period.

Clarence Campbell Conference

(N1) St. Louis Blues vs. (N4) Toronto Maple Leafs

This was the second playoff series meeting between these two teams. This was a rematch of last year's Norris Division Finals, in which St. Louis won in seven games.

(N2) Detroit Red Wings vs. (N3) Chicago Blackhawks

This was the 11th playoff series between these two teams. Chicago lead 6–4 in previous playoff meetings. Chicago won the most recent meeting in a three-game sweep in the 1985 Norris Division Semifinals.

(S1) Edmonton Oilers vs. (S4) Los Angeles Kings

This was the third playoff series meeting between these two teams. Both teams split their previous two meetings. Edmonton won in a three-game sweep in their most recent meeting in the 1985 Smythe Division Semifinals.

(S2) Calgary Flames vs. (S3) Winnipeg Jets

This was the third playoff series meeting between these two teams. Both teams split their previous two meetings over the prior two years. Calgary won last year's Smythe Division Semifinals in a three-game sweep.

This was the last series that the Jets/Coyotes franchise won in Winnipeg; the franchise did not win another playoff series until the 2012 Western Conference Quarterfinal while based in Arizona. This was also the last time a Winnipeg-based NHL team won a playoff series until 2018.

Division Finals

Prince of Wales Conference

(A2) Montreal Canadiens vs. (A4) Quebec Nordiques

This was the fourth playoff series meeting between these two teams. Quebec won two of the previous three meetings, including their most recent meeting in the 1985 Adams Division Finals in seven games.

(P1) Philadelphia Flyers vs. (P3) New York Islanders

This was the fourth playoff series meeting between these two teams. Philadelphia won two of the previous three series, including their most recent in the 1985 Patrick Division Finals in five games.

Clarence Campbell Conference

(N2) Detroit Red Wings vs. (N4) Toronto Maple Leafs

This was the 21st playoff series between these two teams. Toronto led 11–9 in previous playoff series. They last met in the 1964 Stanley Cup Finals, in which Toronto won in seven games.

(S1) Edmonton Oilers vs. (S3) Winnipeg Jets

This was the fourth playoff series meeting between these two teams. Edmonton won all three previous meetings, including their most recent in the 1985 Smythe Division Finals in a four-game sweep.

Conference Finals

Prince of Wales Conference Final

(P1) Philadelphia Flyers vs. (A2) Montreal Canadiens

This was the third playoff series meeting between these two teams. Montreal won both previous meetings, including their last meeting in a four-game sweep in the 1976 Stanley Cup Finals.

Clarence Campbell Conference Final

(S1) Edmonton Oilers vs. (N2) Detroit Red Wings

This was the first playoff series meeting between these two teams.

Stanley Cup Finals 

This was the third playoff series between these two teams, and their second Finals meeting. Both teams split their previous two meetings. Edmonton won the 1985 Stanley Cup Finals in five games. This time, Edmonton was the regular season champion with 50 wins and 106 points, and Philadelphia was second with 46 wins and 100 points.

Unlike the 1985 final, this series would go the distance; and for the first time since 1971, the Stanley Cup Finals went the full seven games. Edmonton took the first two games at home, then split in Philadelphia. However, the Flyers won the next two games, one in Edmonton and one back in Philadelphia by one goal after overcoming two-goal deficits in both games facing elimination, to force a deciding seventh game. Edmonton won game seven to earn its third Stanley Cup in four seasons.

Player statistics

Skaters
These are the top ten skaters based on points.

Goaltenders
This is a combined table of the top five goaltenders based on goals against average and the top five goaltenders based on save percentage, with at least 420 minutes played. The table is sorted by GAA, and the criteria for inclusion are bolded.

See also
1986–87 NHL season
List of Stanley Cup champions

References

 

playoffs
Stanley Cup playoffs